Chris Lightcap is an American double bassist, bass guitarist and composer born in Latrobe, Pennsylvania.

Career
In addition to his work as a bassist he has led a variety of bands since 2000 and has produced six albums of original music. Lightcap's first two CDs as a leader, Lay-Up (2000) and Bigmouth (2003) were released on the Fresh Sound New Talent label and featured a quartet line-up with Gerald Cleaver on drums and Tony Malaby and Bill McHenry on tenor saxophones. Two years later he expanded the group to a quintet, naming it Bigmouth and establishing a line-up of Craig Taborn on keyboards, Chris Cheek and Malaby on tenor saxophones and Cleaver on drums. In 2010 Bigmouth recorded Deluxe, Lightcap's third CD as a leader, on Clean Feed Records with alto saxophonist Andrew D'Angelo also joining the group on three selections. The Wall Street Journal called the recording "superb".

In 2006 he received a commission to compose for the ensemble counter)induction, which premiered his piece Wiretap at the Tenri Cultural Center on October 16, 2006. In 2011 he received a New Jazz Works grant from Chamber Music America. Bigmouth premiered Lightcap's resulting work, Lost and Found at the Earshot Jazz Festival on October 28, 2012 in Seattle, WA. The work was subsequently broadcast on NPR for the show Jazzset with Dee Dee Bridgewater. A performance of the piece the following year was reviewed by The New York Times. Bigmouth's 2015 release on  Clean Feed Records, Epicenter features this batch of music along with a cover of  The Velvet Underground's "All Tomorrow's Parties". 2018 saw the release of his all-electric project Superette on Royal Potato Family which also featured  guests Nels Cline and John Medeski. He received a second CMA New Jazz Works grant in 2016, the result of which was SuperBigmouth (which combined his Bigmouth and Superette bands), released on Pyroclastic Records in 2019. Lightcap's albums have been appeared on year-end "best of" lists published in The New York Times, NPR, the Village Voice, Jazz Times, and Rolling Stone, among other publications.

Lightcap has worked with Marc Ribot, Regina Carter, Craig Taborn, John Medeski, Tomasz Stanko, John Scofield, The Swell Season, Mark Turner, Joe Morris, Chris Potter, Glen Hansard, Sheila Jordan, James Carter, Butch Morris, Ben Monder and Tom Harrell and others.

Lightcap is the cousin of Acetone guitarist Mark Lightcap.

Selected discography

As Leader

As Bassist

References

External links
Chris Lightcap official site
Wall Street Journal Article on Chris Lightcap by Martin Johnson
Clean Feed Press Archive for Chris Lightcap
Allmusic.com Entry
Bigmouth on NPR's Jazzset with Dee Dee Bridgewater

Living people
Williams College alumni
American jazz double-bassists
Male double-bassists
American jazz bass guitarists
People from Latrobe, Pennsylvania
Guitarists from Pennsylvania
American male bass guitarists
Jazz musicians from Pennsylvania
21st-century double-bassists
21st-century American male musicians
American male jazz musicians
Year of birth missing (living people)
The Delphian Jazz Orchestra members